Gove's Rebellion was a short uprising in 1683 in the Province of New Hampshire, in which men of the towns of Exeter and Hampton took up arms against the Royal Governor, Edward Cranfield. The rebels were arrested while attempting to muster more rebels. The leader, Edward Gove, was sentenced to death for high treason, and shipped off to London for sentencing. He was pardoned three years later by James II and returned to New Hampshire. The rebellion took place during a period when many American colonists were rebelling against their respective provincial governments, including Bacon's Rebellion, Coode's Rebellion, Leisler's Rebellion, Culpeper's Rebellion, the Charter Oak Incident, and the Boston Revolt.

Background
New Hampshire had recently been partitioned from Massachusetts by Charles II after almost 40 years of being governed by the neighboring colony, and made into a royal province. From 1679 to 1682, New Hampshire was governed by a locally elected council until James II installed a royal governor, Edward Cranfield. The colonists resented having a governor appointed to them, and Cranfield was particularly unpopular for his enforcement of the mercantilist trade laws of the time. In 1683, when Cranfield attempted to force a revenue bill through the council (which they continually vetoed), he had the council dissolved. He assumed complete control of the colony, and issued a direct tax.

Rebellion
On January 27, 1683, Edward Gove, a now former councilor from Hampton, discussed the idea of rebelling against the governor with other provincial leaders. They advised against it; however, since Gove had been drinking, he decided to rise up anyway. He armed himself, his son, and his servant, and rode his horse to Exeter in an attempt to muster the citizens to rebel against the governor. Along the way, he was stopped by a justice of the peace, Nathaniel Weare (father of Meshech Weare). Gove and his party escaped capture and continued to Exeter, where they succeeded in gathering roughly a dozen armed supporters to the cause. The rebels now returned to Hampton to rally more men to their cause. One man blew a trumpet, and the group caused a ruckus to attract the attention of the townsfolk. It managed to attract the local militia, who proceeded to arrest all but one of the rebels, the trumpeter.

Aftermath
Most of the rebels were found guilty and set free, but Cranfield wanted to make an example of their leader. Edward Gove was tried by a grand jury, and found guilty of high treason. The presiding judge, Major Richard Waldron, sentenced him to be hanged, drawn and quartered. Governor Cranfield, worried that Gove would escape and rouse further rebellion, sent him to Boston, and eventually to London. Gove was imprisoned in the tower of London for almost three years awaiting his execution. His wife pleaded to the King to release her husband, which he eventually did. He returned to New Hampshire, and Edward Cranfield was removed as governor.

References

External links
 Lane Memorial Library: Joseph Dow's History of Hampton
 Seacoast Online: Historically Speaking: Gove's Rebellion of 1683, by Barbra Rimkunas

Military history of the Thirteen Colonies
Pre-statehood history of New Hampshire